The mixed team BC1/BC2 boccia event in the 2020 Summer Paralympics was played between 2 and 4 September 2021. 40 athletes from 10 nations, each team containing 4 athletes, participated in the competition.

Team rosters
Each roster/team has 3 or 4 athletes. All team having both genders, male (M) and female (F).

Argentina:
 Mauricio Ibarbure (M)
 Ailen Flores (F)
 Luis Cristaldo (M)
 Jonathan Aquino (M)
Brazil:
 Jose Carlos Chagas de Oliveira (M)
 Andreza Vitoria de Oliveira (F)
 Maciel Santos (M)
 Natali de Faria (F)
China:
 Zhang Qi (F)
 Yan Zhiqiang (M)
 Lan Zhijian (M)
Great Britain:
 David Smith (M)
 Claire Taggart (F)
 Will Hipwell (M)
Japan:
 Takumi Nakamura (M)
 Yuriko Fujii (F)
 Hidetaka Sugimura (M)
 Takayuki Hirose (M)

South Korea:
 Jung Sung-joon (M)
 Lee Yong-jin (M)
 Jeong So-yeong (F)
Portugal:
 Andre Ramos (M)
 Abilio Valente (M)
 Cristina Gonçalves (F)
 Nelson Fernandes (M)
RPC:
 Mikhail Gutnik (M)
 Olga Dolgova (F)
 Dmitry Kozmin (M)
 Diana Tsyplina (F)
Slovakia:
 Tomas Kral (M)
 Robert Mezik (M)
 Rastislav Kurilak (M)
 Kristina Kudlacova (F)
Thailand:
 Witsanu Huadpradit (M)
 Subin Tipmanee (F)
 Worawut Saengampa (M)
 Watcharaphon Vongsa (M)

Results

Pools
The pool stage will be played between 2 and 3 September where the top 2 teams in each pool will qualify for the quarterfinals.

Pool A

Pool B

Knockout stage
The knockout stage will be played on 4 September.

References

Mixed team BC1-2